The Queen Elizabeth Pool, located on the south side of the North Saskatchewan River valley in Edmonton, Alberta, Canada, is the oldest municipal pool in Western Canada.  The Edmonton Bulletin described the pool as “delightfully situated in what is generally recognized as the city’s most beautiful park."

The original pool was opened on August 22, 1922, but following a crack in the pool's basin, the facility was closed in 2004. The original pool was demolished in the summer of 2011 and reopened later that same year 600m to the west adjacent to the Kinsmen Sports Centre.

The new pool features a 6-lane, 25-metre pool with a zero depth entry, children’s spray park, sun deck, universal access change room and showers and lockers on the pool deck.

Notes

Buildings and structures in Edmonton
Swimming venues in Canada
Demolished buildings and structures in Alberta
Buildings and structures completed in 1922
Buildings and structures demolished in 2011